Langport East was a railway station situated in Langport in Somerset.  The station also served Huish Episcopi.

The station was on the Langport and Castle Cary Railway of the Great Western Railway. While it closed in 1962, the line itself is still in use as part of the Reading to Taunton line.

Services

References 

Disused railway stations in Somerset
Railway stations in Great Britain opened in 1906
Railway stations in Great Britain closed in 1962
Former Great Western Railway stations
Langport